Ayman Ftayni (Arabic: ايمن فتيني; born 27 December 1994 in Riyadh) is a Saudi football player who currently plays as a midfielder for Al-Nairyah.

References

1994 births
Living people
Sportspeople from Riyadh
Saudi Arabian footballers
Association football midfielders
Al Nassr FC players
Khaleej FC players
Al-Raed FC players
Ohod Club players
Al-Orobah FC players
Hetten FC players
Al-Riyadh SC players
Al Jandal Club players
Al-Nairyah Club players
Saudi First Division League players
Saudi Professional League players
Saudi Second Division players